Al Buhayrah may refer to:
Al Buhayrah, Yemen
Al Buhayrah Governorate, one of the Governorates of Egypt
Lac Region, Chad, named Al Buhayrah in Arabic
Lac Prefecture, Chad